Karel Eykman (1 March 1936 – 30 August 2022) was a Dutch writer of children's literature.

Early life 
Eykman started studying theology in 1956.

Career 

In 1969, Eykman published his first book De werksters van half vijf en andere gelijkenissen.

He won the Zilveren Griffel award in 1975 for his book De vreselijk verlegen vogelverschrikker. In 1984, he won the Gouden Griffel award for his book Liefdesverdriet. In the seventies of the twentieth century he was also a member of Het Schrijverscollectief, a group of writers which included Eykman, Willem Wilmink, Hans Dorrestijn, Ries Moonen, Jan Riem and Fetze Pijlman. Together they contributed to television shows such as De Stratemakeropzeeshow and De film van Ome Willem.

In 1986, he published the book De zaak Jan Steen which was the Kinderboekenweekgeschenk during the Boekenweek that year. Many of his books were published by Uitgeverij De Harmonie.

Eykman died in Amsterdam on 30 August 2022, at the age of 86. The Karel Eykman school in Amstelveen is named after him.

Awards 
 1975: Zilveren Griffel, De vreselijk verlegen vogelverschrikker
 1984: Gouden Griffel, Liefdesverdriet

References

External links 

 Karel Eykman (in Dutch), Digital Library for Dutch Literature
 
  as Karel Eykman
  as Karel Eijkman

1936 births
2022 deaths
Dutch children's writers
Gouden Griffel winners
People from Rotterdam